Seavus is an international software development and consulting company based in Lund, Sweden. Seavus Group provides enterprise-wide business products to large organizations and government agencies.

History 
Seavus is a business software company founded by Igor Lestar, Richard Murbeck and Gligor Dacevski in 1999 in Malmö.

In 2003, the company released the first version of Seavus Project Viewer.

In 2004, the Seavus opened its first office in the United States in an effort to expand beyond Europe and enter the markets in North and South America.

In 2009, the first versions of Seavus Project Planner and Savus DropMind; DropMind was later rebranded as iMindQ in 2014.

Seavus was nominated by TM Forum for the "Solution Excellence Award" in 2011 and 2012.

In 2012, Seavus introduced Crystal Qube at the Mobile World Congress in Barcelona, Spain. In the same year, BestAppEver ranked Seavus' iOS games Yatzy Ultimate and Black Jack Ultimate third place for the best dice game and the best casino game, respectively.

In 2013, the latest solution on gaming platforms and payment methods, Seavus Guardians, was presented at the 12th European iGaming Congress&Expo (EiG) 2013—the largest European gaming event in Barcelona. Further, in only one month, additional 6 more games were launched by the Seavus Gaming team.

In 2015, Seavus Gaming team launched Yatzi Ultimate for Android. In the same year, Seavus continued its growth on the Scandinavian market through the acquisition of OnTrax AB, a Stockholm-based IT Consultancy Company.

In 2016, Seavus incubator launched iThink, an operation for accelerating visionary young startup companies. iThink was marketed as the first technology academy for children in Macedonia started working as part of Seavus Education and Development Center. The first version of ScheduleReader was also launched in 2016.

In 2017, Seavus DOOEL was certified as a Cisco Select Certified Partner Partner in EUROPE EAST.

In January 2017,  "Ontrax AB" became Seavus Stockholm AB.

In 2018, MSP-501 Channel Futures listed Seavus AB as one of the Top 501 Global Managed Service Providers.

In 2019, Seavus was named Youth Employer of the year. They were also ranked in the top 50 Global Managed Service Providers by Channel Futures and  awarded EMEA Premier Partner status by Cherwell the same year.

Seavus became Gold Solution Partnership.

Seavus Managed Services division won 2nd place on the Channel Futures European Partners 51 (EP 51) rankings.

In 2019, Seavus celebrated its 20th Anniversary.

In 2020, Seavus was a finalist for the European IT and Software Excellence Awards 2020.

In 2021, Seavus became partners with Salesforce.

Operations 
Seavus has 15 operating offices located in 8 countries—Sweden, the United States, North Macedonia, Belarus, Switzerland, Serbia, Bosnia and Herzegovina and Moldova,—with continuous growth strategy.

Seavus serves a multinational client base that includes over 3,000 organizations. It is a Microsoft Gold Partner and has also partnerships with Oracle, Cisco, IBM, Serena Software, ABBYY, Atlassian, Salesforce.

Products and services 

Seavus Group delivers BSS/OSS for Telcos, customer relationship management, customer experience management, Billing systems, enterprise software for Banks, Financial, Trading and Fin-Tech industry, Insurance, DWH and business intelligence, Application lifecycle management (ALM), Embedded programming and managed services.

Seavus is the producer of Crystal Qube—customer experience solution that transforms all customer data into business intelligence.

Seavus is now a globally authorized master distributor for the following software products:

 Seavus Project Viewer  project management software that is designed to assist users (team members, team leads, project stakeholder and other project participant) to review their project assignments, print the project information and follow the overall project status. It reads .mpp file format.
 iMindQ  mind mapping and brainstorming software application that supports users in creative idea capturing, memorization and thought process improvements, meeting management and management information overload, as well as task and project management through the use of concept maps, flowcharts and mind maps. The non-linear and logical approach in outlining ideas with mind maps assists in individual and group brainstorming sessions.

References

External links 
 

Software companies of Sweden
Companies based in Lund